Thedtsho Gewog (Dzongkha: ཐེད་ཚོ་) is a gewog (village block) of Wangdue Phodrang District, Bhutan. It is one of fifteen geowogs in the district.

References

Gewogs of Bhutan
Wangdue Phodrang District